{{Infobox airport
| name = Milan Malpensa Airport
| nativename = Aeroporto di Milano Malpensa "Città di Milano"
| image = Milan_Airports.svg
| image-width = 175
| image2 = Malpensa_Airport_aerial_view.jpg
| image2-width = 250
| IATA = MXP
| ICAO = LIMC
| WMO = 16066
| type = Public
| owner = SEA SpA
| operator = SEA Aeroporti di Milano
| city-served = Milan metropolitan area
| location = Ferno, Varese
| opened = 
| hub = 
Cargolux Italia
DHL Aviation
FedEx Express
| focus_city = 
AlbaStar
Amazon Air
easyJet Europe
Malta Air
Neos
Ryanair
Wizz Air
| elevation-f = 1000
| elevation-m = 304.8
| coordinates = 
| website = milanomalpensa-airport.com
| pushpin_map = Italy Lombardy#Italy#Europe
| pushpin_label_position = 
| pushpin_label = MXP
| pushpin_map_alt = 
| pushpin_mapsize = 
| pushpin_image = 
| pushpin_map_caption = Location within Northern Italy
| metric-rwy = y
| r1-number = 17L/35R
| r1-length-f = 12,861
| r1-length-m = 3,920
| r1-surface = Asphalt
| r2-number = 17R/35L
| r2-length-f = 12,861
| r2-length-m = 3,920
| r2-surface = Asphalt
| stat1-header = Passengers
| stat1-data = 
| stat2-header = 
| stat2-data =  121.9%
| stat3-header = Aircraft movements
| stat3-data = 
| stat4-header = 
| stat4-data =  57.7%
| stat5-header = Cargo (tons)
| stat5-data = 721,255
| stat6-header = 
| stat6-data =  3.5%
| stat-year = 2022
| footnotes = Statistics from Assaeroporti <ref>
Milan Malpensa Airport  is the largest international airport in northern Italy, serving Lombardy, Piedmont and Liguria, as well as the Swiss Canton of Ticino.

In 2022, Malpensa Airport handled 21.3 million passengers and was the 23rd busiest airport in Europe in terms of passengers and 2nd busiest airport in Italy in terms of passengers after Rome Fiumicino Airport, and the busiest in Italy for freight and cargo, handling 721.254 tons of international freight annually (2022).

Malpensa airport is 9th in the world and 6th in Europe for the number of countries served with direct scheduled flights.

Together with Linate Airport and Orio al Serio Airport, it forms the Milan airport system with 42,2 million passengers in 2022, the largest airport system in Italy by number of passengers.

The airport was opened in 1909 by Giovanni Agusta and Gianni Caproni to test their aircraft prototypes, before switching to civil operation in 1948.

History

Early years

The site of today's Malpensa Airport has seen aviation activities for more than 100 years. The first began on 27 May 1910, when the Caproni brothers flew their "flying machine", the Cal biplane. In the years that followed, many aircraft prototypes took off from the same site; eventually, it was decided to upgrade the farming patch to a more formal airfield. Both Gianni Caproni and Giovanni Agusta established factories on the new site; the airfield soon developed into the largest aircraft production centre in Italy.

During the 1920s and 1930s, the airfield hosted two squadrons of the Regia Aeronautica Italiana (Italian Air Force). In September 1943, Malpensa airfield was taken over by Nazi Germany's Luftwaffe when northern Italy was invaded by Adolf Hitler. Soon after their arrival, the Germans laid the airfield's first concrete runway.

After the cessation of hostilities during the Second World War, manufacturers and politicians of the Milan and Varese regions, led by banker Benigno Ajroldi of Banca Alto Milanese, restored the airfield. They aimed to make it an industrial fulcrum for the post-war recovery of Italy. The main runway, heavily damaged by German troops as they retreated from northern Italy, was rebuilt and extended to 1,800 metres. A small wooden terminal was constructed to protect goods and passengers from bad weather.

After World War II

Malpensa Airport officially commenced commercial operations on 21 November 1948 as Aeroporto Città di Busto Arsizio, although the Belgian national flag-carrier Sabena had started flying to Brussels from here a year earlier. On 2 February 1950 Trans World Airlines (TWA) became the first company to fly long-haul flights from Malpensa, using Lockheed Constellations on their services to New York Idlewild Airport (now JFK).

A change of ownership occurred in 1952 when the Municipality of Milan took control of the airport's operator, the Società Aeroporto di Busto Arsizio. After assuming full control, SEA decided to develop Malpensa as an international and intercontinental gateway, whereas Milan's other airport, Linate Airport, would be tasked with handling only domestic services.

By the early 1960s, however, major European carriers such as British Airways, Air France, Lufthansa and Alitalia had moved the majority of their services to Linate Airport, which was just 11 km east of Milan's city centre, making it much easier for passengers to reach central Milan. This left Malpensa with just a handful of intercontinental links, charter flights and cargo operations. Malpensa suffered a decline in commercial traffic, with passenger numbers dropping from 525,000 in 1960 to just 331,000 by 1965. It was destined to play second fiddle to Linate Airport for another 20 years.

Expansion and development (1995–1998)

By the mid-1980s Linate Airport was handling seven million passengers per year and, with only a short single runway and limited parking slots, had reached its saturation point. With no available land nearby for expansion, an alternative solution was sought: Società Esercizi Aeroportuali SpA (SEA) quickly found that developing Malpensa was the only practical alternative.

By the end of 1985, a law had been passed by the Italian Parliament that paved the way for the reorganisation of the Milan airport system. Malpensa was designated as the centre for all services covering northern Italy, while Linate Airport was downgraded to a domestic and short-haul facility. "Malpensa 2000", as the plan was called, included the construction of a new terminal as well as the development of fast, efficient connections to Milan's city centre. The European Union recognised this project as one of the 14 "Essential to the Development of the Union" and provided €200 million to help finance the work. Construction started in November 1990; Malpensa airport was re-opened eight years later.

Alitalia's main hub (1998–2008) 

During the night of 24/25 October 1998, Alitalia moved the majority of its fleet from Rome Fiumicino Airport – where it had been flying from for over 50 years – to Malpensa Airport. The airport started a new lease of life as the Italian flag carrier's main hub. Alitalia added up to 488 movements and 42,000 passengers a day at the facility which, by the end of 1998, had handled 5.92 million passengers (an increase of more than two million over the previous year's figure).

In 1999, it recorded a spectacular leap to 16.97 million and, by 2007, passenger numbers had reached 23.9 million. Efficient rail links from two different stations in Milan (Centrale and Cadorna stations) ensured easy access by railway, whereas the nearby A8 motorway had an extra lane added in each direction to help speed up traffic into and out of the city centre.

Before 2001, ground handling services at Malpensa were shared by the SEA (airport's operator) and Trans-World Airlines. Since then, the contracting process has gradually been deregulated. In 2000, airport security services at Malpensa were transferred from the Polizia di Stato (State Police) to SEA's internal division, SEA Airport Security. Up to 2002, SEA was assisted by IVRI in providing security services, but the contract was not renewed after its expiry. Nevertheless, SEA Airport Security is supervised by the Polizia di Stato (Italian State Police), Guardia di Finanza (Italian Military Customs Police) and Ente Nazionale Aviazione Civile (Italy's Civil Aviation Authority), whereas the Carabinieri (Italian Military Police) supervises ramp entrance.

Ramp services are provided by SEA Handling, ATA and, more recently, Aviapartner. SEA Handling provided 80% of the ramp services at Malpensa Airport due to its major customer, Alitalia. In May 2006, however, Italy's Civil Aviation Authority took off the limitation of two ramp handlers.

In 2008, a new development plan was launched by Società Esercizi Aeroportuali SpA (SEA), valued at €1.4 billion, to include a third pier for Terminal 1 and the construction of a third runway. In a surprise move, however, Alitalia announced its decision to revert to Rome Fiumicino Airport as its main hub, due to 'high operating costs' at Malpensa Airport. Alitalia did not pull out of Malpensa altogether and continues to fly several domestic and European services from Milan and two intercontinental flights (to New York–JFK and Tokyo–Narita). However, Malpensa lost around 20% of its daily movements, a decrease from 700 to 550, which resulted in only 19.2 million passengers passing through in 2008. The airport continued to suffer during 2009 when the international financial crisis and higher fuel prices caused a reduction to only 17.6 million passengers that year.

2010s
Responding to Alitalia's pullout, the operator SEA launched an all-out publicity programme and aggressively marketed Malpensa Airport around the world. As a result, from 2008 to 2011, a total of 34 new passenger and cargo routes were added to Malpensa's network.

The low-cost carrier EasyJet made Malpensa its main base after London Gatwick, with more than 20 of its Airbus A319s and Airbus A320s based there. The airline currently flies services from Malpensa to more than 70 destinations in Italy and across Europe. Competitor Ryanair confirmed plans to open an operating base at Malpensa from December 2015, initially with one aircraft.

In 2014, a contract was awarded for extension of the railway line from Terminal 1 to Terminal 2. The line was opened in December 2016. The new Malpensa Terminal 2 railway station is within 200 m north of the T2 arrivals hall, that is accessed by an outdoor covered walkway.

Terminals

Malpensa Airport has two passenger terminals and they are connected by airport shuttle buses and trains.

Terminal 1
Terminal 1, which opened in 1998, is the newer, larger and more prominent terminal. The terminal is divided into three sections and handles most passengers on scheduled as well as charter flights:

 Concourse A handles domestic and intra-Schengen flights.
 Concourse B handles non-Schengen and intercontinental flights.
 Concourse C (B2), opened in January 2012, handles non-Schengen, intercontinental flights and security-sensitive flights to USA and Israel.

Terminal 2
Terminal 2 is the older terminal. It was previously used exclusively by easyJet, but has been closed since 2020 due to the COVID-19 pandemic. It is undergoing improvement works and is scheduled to reopen in Summer 2023. All charter services, which were previously based in this terminal, moved to Terminal 1 upon its opening.

Malpensa Airport additionally provides free shuttles connecting Terminal 2 to Terminal 1.

Airlines and destinations

Passenger
The following airlines operate regular scheduled, seasonal and charter flights to and from Malpensa:

Cargo
The following airlines operate regular cargo services to and from Malpensa:

Statistics

Busiest routes

Movements by country

General statistics

Transport links

Rail

The airport is served by two train stations, one in each terminal.

Malpensa Express

Malpensa Express is a direct train connection between Terminal 2, Terminal 1 and Milan's city centre.

As of 2019, its service is based on a clock-face timetable with four services per hour in both directions: two run between the two airport terminals and Milan Cadorna station; the other two between the two airport terminals, Milan Garibaldi and Milan Centrale stations. All services call at Busto Arsizio Nord, Saronno (connections for Como, Novara and Varese) and Milan Bovisa stations.

The journey time ranges between 30 and 50 minutes, depending on the type of service and the number of stops.

Other train services

TiLo operate services to Bellinzona in Switzerland.

Milan's Suburban Line S10 (Milano Rogoredo–Milano Bovisa) ran to Malpensa Airport/Aeroporto from June 2010. Trains called at: Ferno, Busto Arsizio, Castellanza, Rescaldina, Saronno, Milano Bovisa, Milano Lancetti, Milano Porta Garibaldi M2-M5, Milano Repubblica M3, Milano Porta Venezia M1, Milano Dateo and Milano Porta Vittoria. The service was terminated in October 2012.

The Malpensa – Varese – Mendrisio (CH) – Lugano (CH) line provides a direct connection between Malpensa Airport/Aeroporto and the south-eastern part of Switzerland. There are plans to connect Gallarate Station and Milan's Centrale Station (FS), which is currently a terminus station with no through tracks, to allow more convenient access to high-speed international lines.

Bus
 Malpensa Shuttle and Malpensa Bus Express connect the airport to Milan Central station (Trenitalia's National Railway hub) and for Milan's Metro network. The shuttle bus calls at Terminals 1 and 2, Busto Arsizio and Milan Fair (on request). Journey time is 60–70 minutes.
 A free, 24-hour shuttle bus provides access to Terminal 2 from Terminal 1. The bus leaves every 7 minutes. Journey time is 15–20 minutes.
 Malpensa Airport has a direct coach connection with Milan's Linate Airport.
 From March 2018 both Terminals are connected to major cities in Northern Italy. This service is provided by BusItalia Fast (a society participated by Trenitalia and the Italian Rail Co.) and connects the airport with Aosta (Aosta Valley), Novara, Santhià, Turin (Piedmont), Sanremo, Savona, Ventimiglia (Liguria) once a day; Padua, Venice Marco Polo Airport, Verona (Veneto), Trieste (Friuli-Venezia Giulia) twice a day; Genoa (Liguria) three times a day.

Road
Malpensa Airport is accessible by a four-lane motorway to the A8 (connecting Switzerland to Milan) and by a five-lane motorway to the A4 (connecting Turin/Torino, Verona, Venice and Triest/Trieste). Local access to the airport is provided by the State Road SS336 from Busto Arsizio and by the State Road SS336dir from Magenta.

References

External links
 
 
 Milan–Malpensa Airport – Official website
 SEA SpA – Official website
 Malpensa Airport AOC & USERS Committees MXP Milan
 Malpensa Airport Arrivals and Departures
 

1909 establishments in Italy
Airports established in 1909
Airports in Milan
Buildings and structures in the Province of Varese